Enathu Bridge is the oldest bridge in Enathu, Kollam, Kerala constructed in 1998. This  bridge connected Pathanamthitta and Kollam districts through Kallada River.

In January 2017 when cracks detected on the bridge, it was closed for maintenance.

On August 31, 2017 the bridge reopened for public transport.

References

Bridges in Kerala
Buildings and structures in Pathanamthitta district